Tennis competitions at the 2011 Games of the Small States of Europe were held from June 1 to June 4 at the Tenniscenter Bannholz in Vaduz. The tournament was played on clay courts.

Medal summary

Medal table

Medal events

References 
Tennis Site of the 2011 Games of the Small States of Europe

 
Games of the Small States of Europe
2011 Games of the Small States of Europe
2011